John Monks is a former General Secretary of the Trades Union Congress (TUC) in the UK.

John Monks may also refer to:
John Monks Jr. (1910–2004), American author, actor, and Marine
John Austin Sands Monks (1850–1917), American painter
John Clark Monks (1760–1827), also known as the Hanging Sailor of Perryman, sea captain

See also
John Monk (disambiguation)